Firdaus Ramadhan (born May 8, 1988) is an Indonesian professional footballer who played as a defender.

Career

Semen Padang
He was signed for Semen Padang to play in Liga 2 in the 2020 season.

References

External links
 Firdaus Ramadhan at Liga Indonesia
 Firdaus Ramadhan at Soccerway

1988 births
Association football defenders
Living people
Indonesian footballers
Liga 1 (Indonesia) players
Deltras F.C. players
Pelita Jaya FC players
Persitara Jakarta Utara players
Indonesian Premier Division players
Persita Tangerang players
Borneo F.C. players
People from Tangerang
Sportspeople from Banten